Daniel Cooper is a Grand Prix motorcycle racer from United Kingdom. He currently races in the National Superstock 1000 Championship, aboard a BMW S1000RR.

Career statistics

By season

Races by year
(key)

References

http://www.motogp.com/en/riders/Daniel+Cooper

British motorcycle racers
1987 births
Living people
125cc World Championship riders